East End Tigers Football Club, simply known as the East End Tigers, is a Sierra Leonean football club based in Tongoma, Kenema District. The club plays in the Sierra Leone National Premier League. The club's supporters are mainly from the town of Tongoma and Kenema District overall. The team was formerly known as Gem Stars of Tongoma.

Rivalry
The Gem Stars' major rivals are the Kamboi Eagles of Kenema. Both clubs are based in Kenema District.

References

Football clubs in Sierra Leone